Odontolite, also called bone turquoise or fossil turquoise or occidental turquoise, is fossil bone or ivory that has been traditionally thought to have been altered by turquoise or similar phosphate minerals such as vivianite.

References 
 

Phosphate minerals